Boy Hits Car is a 2001 album by the alternative metal band Boy Hits Car released on Wind-Up Records. It remains their most popular and well-known album, with "I'm A Cloud" being popular, and even making it into the soundtrack of some works in popular culture, such as Aggressive Inline and The Funimation's in-house English adaptation of Dragon Ball Z Lord Slug.

Reception 
Allmusic.com's Bradley Torreano gave the album two and a half stars. He wrote in his review "The best way to describe Boy Hits Car, the sophomore effort from the band of the same name, is to combine the elements of a few of their contemporaries. Take the angst and urgency of At the Drive-In, toss in a dash of the playful singing style of System of a Down, and mix in the generic Korn-knockoff riffing of Hed PE. What you get is a band with a lot of good intentions and a great singer, but lacking in songwriting skills."

Track listing

References 

2001 albums
Boy Hits Car albums